Leroy Brown may refer to:

Leroy Brown (coach) (1887–?), American football and basketball coach
Leroy Brown (high jumper) (1902–1970), Olympic medal-winning American athlete
Leroy Brown (wrestler) (1950–1988), American professional wrestler
Leroy Brown, fictional protagonist of the book series Encyclopedia Brown

See also
"Bad, Bad Leroy Brown", a 1973 song by Jim Croce
"Bring Back That Leroy Brown", a 1974 song by Queen
"Mrs. Leroy Brown", a 2004 song by Loretta Lynn